Cantumayo (possibly from Quechua qantu, qantus, qantuta a plant (Cantua buxifolia), mayu river,) is a river in Peru located in the Arequipa Region, Caylloma Province, Coporaque District. It originates in the Chila mountain range southeast of the mountain Mismi. Its direction is mainly to the south where it meets Colca River as a right affluent. The confluence is north of the town Coporaque.

References

Rivers of Peru
Rivers of Arequipa Region